This is a list of women writers of Guyana.

A-M
 Andaiye (1942–2019)
 Mahadai Das (b. 1954)
 Brenda DoHarris (b. 1946)
 Beryl Gilroy (1924–2001)
 Janet Jagan (1920–2009)
 Meiling Jin (b. 1956)
 Laxmi Kallicharan (1951–2002)
 Oonya Kempadoo (b. 1966)
 Karen King-Aribisala (living)
 Sharon Maas (b. 1951)
 Pauline Melville (b. 1948)

N-Z
 Grace Nichols (b. 1950)
 Elly Niland (b. 1954)
 C. M. Rubin (living)
 Ryhaan Shah (living)
 Rajkumari Singh (1923–1979)
 Narmala Shewcharan (living)
 Jan Shinebourne (b. 1947)
 Rajkumari Singh (1923–1979)
 Maya Tiwari (b. 1952)

 

Guyanese women writers
Writers